Baillie is a surname of Scottish origin. Notable people with the surname include:

Baillie of Jerviswood (died 1684), Scottish conspirator
Sir Adrian Baillie, 6th Baronet (1898–1947), British politician
Albert Victor Baillie, Anglican clergyman
Alec Baillie, American bassist
Alexander Baillie, English cellist
Allan Baillie (born 1943), Australian writer
Augustus Baillie (1861–1939), British soldier and lawyer
Bill Baillie (born 1934), New Zealand athlete
Bruce Baillie (1931-2020), American film director
Caroline Baillie, British materials scientist and academic at the University of San Diego
Charles Baillie, several people
Chris Baillie (hurdler), Scottish athlete
Chris Baillie (politician), New Zealand politician
Cuthbert Baillie (died 1514), Treasurer of Scotland
David Baillie (comics) (born 1977), Scottish writer and illustrator
David Baillie (footballer) (1905–1967), English footballer
Donald Macpherson Baillie (1887–1954), Scottish theologian, ecumenist, and parish minister
Doug Baillie (born 1937), Scottish footballer and sportswriter
Evan Baillie (1741–1835), British West Indies merchant, landowner and Whig politician
Sir Frank Wilton Baillie (1875–1921), Canadian industrialist
Lady Grisell Baillie (1822–1891), first woman to be created a Deaconess in the Church of Scotland
Lady Grizel Baillie (1665–1746), Scottish songwriter
Henry Baillie (1803–1885), British Conservative politician
James Baillie, several people
Sir Gawaine Baillie, 7th Baronet (1934–2003), amateur motor racing driver, engineer, industrialist, stamp collector
Isobel Baillie (1895–1983), Scottish soprano
Jackie Baillie (born 1964), Labour Member of the Scottish Parliament for the Dumbarton constituency
James Black Baillie (1872–1940), British moral philosopher
James Evan Bruce Baillie (1859–1931), British Unionist politician
Joanna Baillie (1762–1851), Scottish poet and dramatist
Joe Baillie (1929–1966), Scottish footballer
John Baillie, several people
Jonathan Baillie (born 1985), Scottish footballer
Martha Baillie (born 1960), Canadian poet and novelist
Marianne Baillie (1795?-1830), nee Wathen, traveller and verse-writer 
Matthew Baillie (1761–1823), Scottish physician and pathologist
Michael Baillie, 3rd Baron Burton (1924–2013), British peer
Mike Baillie, Professor of Palaeoecology at Queen's University of Belfast
Olive, Lady Baillie (1899–1974), Anglo-American heiress
Robert Baillie (1602–1662), Scottish divine and historical writer
Thomas Baillie (1796–1863), British soldier
Tim Baillie, British slalom canoeist
William Baillie, several people

See also 

Baillie baronets
Hamilton-Baillie
Bailey (surname)
Bailie (name)